The Fred Tunturi House is a historic residence located in Portland, Oregon, United States. Built in 1922, it is the only well-preserved Craftsman bungalow in the Walnut Park district of Portland that exhibits two classic features of the bungalow type: a full-width porch and a low, continuous, gable roof.

The house was entered on the National Register of Historic Places in 1996.

See also
National Register of Historic Places listings in Northeast Portland, Oregon

References

External links

Oregon Historic Sites Database entry

American Craftsman architecture in Oregon
Bungalow architecture in Oregon
Residential buildings completed in 1922
1922 establishments in Oregon
Houses on the National Register of Historic Places in Portland, Oregon
King, Portland, Oregon
Portland Historic Landmarks